The Memorial for Chairman Mao's Inspection of the North Park Commune is a historical site in the City of Jinan, Shandong, China. The memorial commemorates an inspection visit by Mao Zedong on August 9, 1958, during a tour of the provinces Hebei, Henan. The purpose of the tour was to promote the idea of the People's Commune. During this visit, Mao made the statement "People's Communes are good" which triggered the collectivization in the Great Leap Forward. The North Park Commune was organized on August 20, 1958, a few days after Mao's visit, as the first People's Commune in Shandong.

The site is located on the grounds of the North Park Middle School (北园中学) in Shuitun Village (水屯村), Tianqiao District. It consists of a larger-than-life statue of Mao Zedong positioned in front of an inscription with his remark ("People's Communes are good"). It was inscribed as a historical site protected by Shandong Province in December 1977 (site number 1-01).

See also
List of sites in Jinan
Major historical and cultural sites protected by Shandong Province

References

Economic history of the People's Republic of China
Statues of Mao Zedong
Outdoor sculptures in China
Tourist attractions in Shandong